Le Neve is a surname. People with that name include:

 Clement le Neve Foster (1841–1904), English geologist and mineralogist
 Ethel Le Neve (1883–1967), mistress of the murderer Dr. Hawley Harvey Crippen
 John Le Neve (1679–1741), English antiquary
 Mélissa Le Nevé (born 1989), French professional rock climber
 Oliver Le Neve (1662–1711), Norfolk country squire, landowning sportsman, and duellist
 Peter Le Neve (1661–1729), English herald and antiquary
 Peter le Neve Foster (1809–1879), English barrister and mathematician
 William Le Neve (1600? – 1661), English herald and genealogist